Auchmis inextricata is a moth of the family Noctuidae first described by Frederic Moore in 1881. It is found in India, China and Taiwan.

References

Moths described in 1881
Acronictinae